Imperial and Royal Field Marshal may refer to:
 Imperial and Royal Field Marshal (1930 film), a Czechoslovak comedy film
 Imperial and Royal Field Marshal (1956 film), an Austrian historical comedy film